The Giraffidae are a family of ruminant artiodactyl mammals that share a common ancestor with deer and bovids. This family, once a diverse group spread throughout Eurasia and Africa, presently comprises only two extant genera, the giraffe (one or more species of Giraffa, depending on taxonomic interpretation) and the okapi (the only known species of Okapia). Both are confined to sub-Saharan Africa: the giraffe to the open savannas, and the okapi to the dense rainforest of the Congo. The two genera look very different on first sight, but share a number of common features, including a long, dark-coloured tongue, lobed canine teeth, and horns covered in skin, called ossicones.

Taxonomy
{| class="wikitable"
|-
! Image !! Genus   !! Living species
|-
|||Okapia  || 
Okapia johnstoni
|-
|||Giraffa ||
One species taxonomy:
 Giraffa camelopardalis
Four species taxonomy:
 Giraffa camelopardalis
 Giraffa giraffa
 Giraffa reticulata
 Giraffa tippelskirchi
Eight species taxonomy:
 Giraffa camelopardalis
 Giraffa antiquorum
 Giraffa peralta
 Giraffa giraffa
 Giraffa angolensis
 Giraffa reticulata
 Giraffa tippelskirchi
 Giraffa thornicrofti
|-
|}

Evolutionary background

The giraffids are ruminants of the clade Pecora. Other extant pecorans are the families Antilocapridae (pronghorns), Cervidae (deer), Moschidae (musk deer), and Bovidae (cattle, goats and sheep, wildebeests and allies, and antelopes). The exact interrelationships among the pecorans have been debated, mainly focusing on the placement of Giraffidae, but a recent large-scale ruminant genome sequencing study suggests Antilocapridae are the sister taxon to Giraffidae, as shown in the cladogram below. 

The ancestors of pronghorn diverged from the giraffids in the Early Miocene. This was in part of a relatively late mammal diversification following a climate change that transformed subtropical woodlands into open savannah grasslands.

The fossil record of giraffids and their stem-relatives is quite intensive, with fossil of these taxa include Gelocidae, Palaeomerycidae, Prolibytheridae, and Climacoceratidae. It is thought the palaeomerycids is the ancestral group that given rise to the prolibytherids, climacoceratids and the giraffids, all three forming a clade of pecorans known as Giraffomorpha. The relationship between the climacoceratids and giraffids is supported by the presence of a bilobed canine, and have been postulated into two hypotheses. One is the climacoceratids were the ancestors of the sivatheres, as both groups were large, deer-like giraffoids with branching antler-like ossicones, while an extinct basal group of giraffoids, canthumerycines, evolved into the ancestors of Giraffidae. Another more commonly supported hypothesis is climacoceratids were merely the sister clade to giraffids, with sivatheres being either basal giraffids or descended from a lineage that also includes the okapi. While the current range of giraffids today is in Africa, the fossil record of the group has shown this family was once widespread throughout of Eurasia.

Below is the phylogenetic relationships of giraffomorphs after Solounias (2007), Sánchez et al. (2015) and Ríos et al. (2017):

Classification

Below is the total taxonomy of valid extant and fossil taxa (as well as junior synonyms which are listed in the brackets).

Family Giraffidae J.E.Gray, 1821
 Basal extinct giraffids
 †Csakvarotherium Kretzoi, 1930
 †Csakvarotherium hungaricum Kretzoi, 1930
 †Injanatherium Heintz, Brunet & Sen, 1981
 †Injanatherium arabicum Morales, Soria & Thomas, 1987
 †Injanatherium hazimi Heintz, Brunet & Sen, 1981
 †Propalaeomeryx Lydekker, 1883 [Progiraffa Pilgrim, 1908]
 †Propalaeomeryx sivalensis Lydekker, 1883 [Progiraffa exigua Pilgrim, 1908]
 †Shansitherium Killgus, 1922 [Schansitherium [sic]]
 †Shansitherium quadricornis (Bohlin, 1926) [Palaeotragus quadricornis Bohlin, 1926]
 †Shansitherium tafeli Killgus, 1922
 †Umbrotherium Abbazzi, Delfino, Gallai, Trebini & Rook, 2008
 †Umbrotherium azzarolii Abbazzi, Delfino, Gallai, Trebini & Rook, 2008
 Subfamily †Canthumerycinae Hamilton, 1978
 †Georgiomeryx Paraskevaidis, 1940
 †Georgiomeryx georgalasi Paraskevaidis, 1940
 †Canthumeryx Hamilton 1973 [Zarafa Hamilton, 1973]
 †Canthumeryx sirtensis Hamilton 1973 [Zarafa zelteni Hamilton, 1973]
 Subfamily Giraffinae J.E.Gray, 1821 
 Tribe Giraffini J.E.Gray, 1821
 Subtribe Giraffina J.E.Gray, 1821
 Giraffa Brisson, 1762 [Camelopardalis von Schreber, 1784 and Orasius Oken, 1816]
 Giraffa camelopardalis super-complex (Linnaeus, 1758)
 Giraffa giraffa complex (von Schreber, 1784)
 Giraffa angolensis Lydekker, 1903 – Angolan giraffe
 Giraffa giraffa (von Schreber, 1784) – South African giraffe
 Giraffa tippelskirchii complex Matschie, 1898
 Giraffa thornicrofti Lydekker, 1911 – Rhodesian giraffe
 Giraffa tippelskirchii Matschie, 1898 – Masai giraffe
 Giraffa reticulata de Winton, 1899 – Reticulated giraffe
 Giraffa camelopardalis complex (Linnaeus, 1758)
 Giraffa peralta Thomas, 1898 – West African giraffe
 Giraffa antiquorum Jardine & Swainson, 1835 – Kordofan giraffe
 Giraffa camelopardalis (Linnaeus, 1758) – Northern giraffe
 Giraffa camelopardalis rothschildi Lydekker, 1903 – Rothschild's giraffe
 Giraffa camelopardalis camelopardalis (Linnaeus, 1758) – Nubian giraffe
 †Giraffa jumae Leakey, 1967
 †Giraffa priscilla Pilgrim, 1911
 †Giraffa punjabiensis Pilgrim, 1911
 †Giraffa pygmaea Harris, 1976
 †Giraffa sivalensis (Falconer & Cautley, 1843) [Camelopardalis sivalensis Falconer & Cautley, 1843 and Camelopardalis affinis Falconer & Cautley, 1843]
 †Giraffa stillei (Dietrich, 1942) [Okapia stillei Dietrich, 1942 and Giraffa gracilis Arambourg, 1947]
 Subtribe †Bohlinina Solounias, 2007
 †Bohlinia Matthew, 1929
 †Bohlinia adoumi Likius, Vignaud & Brunet, 2007
 †Bohlinia attica (Gaudry & Lartet, 1856) [Giraffa attica (Gaudry & Lartet, 1856) and Orasius attica (Gaudry & Lartet, 1856)]
 †Bohlinia nikitiae Kostopoulos, Koliadimou & Koufos, 1996
 †Honanotherium Bohlin, 1927
 †Honanotherium bernori Solounias & Danowitz, 2016
 †Honanotherium schlosseri (Pilgrim, 1911) [Giraffa schlosseri Pilgrim, 1911]
 Tribe Palaeotragini Pilgrim, 1910
 Subtribe †Palaeotragina Pilgrim, 1910
 †Giraffokeryx Pilgrim, 1910
 †Giraffokeryx anatoliensis Geraads & Aslan, 2003
 †Giraffokeryx primaevus (Churcher, 1970) [Palaeotragus primaevus Churcher, 1970; Samotherium africanum Churcher, 1970 and Amotherium africanum [sic]]
 †Giraffokeryx punjabiensis Pilgrim, 1910
 †Mitilanotherium †Mitilanotherium inexpectatum †Palaeogiraffa Bonis & Bouvrain, 2003
 †Palaeogiraffa macedoniae (Geraads, 1989) [Decennatherium macedoniae Geraads, 1989]
 †Palaeogiraffa major Bonis & Bouvrain, 2003
 †Palaeogiraffa pamiri (Ozansoy, 1965) [Samotherium pamiri Ozansoy, 1965]
 †Palaeotragus Gaudry, 1861 [Achtiaria Borissiak, 1914; Macedonitherium Sickenberg, 1967; Mitilanotherium Samson & Radulesco, 1966 and Sogdianotherium Sharapov, 1974]
 †Palaeotragus coelophrys (Rodler & Weithofer, 1890) [Alcicephalus coelophrys Rodler & Weithofer, 1890]
 †Palaeotragus germaini Arambourg, 1959
 †Palaeotragus inexspectatus (Samson & Radulesco, 1966) [Macedonitherium martinii Sickenberg, 1967; Mitilanotherium inexpectatum Samson & Radulesco, 1966; Mitilanotherium kuruksaense (Sharapov, 1974); Mitilanotherium martinii (Sickenberg, 1967); Palaeotragus priasovicus Godina & Bajgusheva, 1985 and Sogdianotherium kuruksaense Sharapov, 1974]
 †Palaeotragus lavocanti Heintz, 1976
 †Palaeotragus robinsoni Crusafont-Pairó, 1979
 †Palaeotragus rouenii Gaudry, 1861 [Palaeotragus microdon Koken, 1885]
 †Palaeotragus tungurensis Colbert, 1936
 †Samotherium Forsyth Major, 1888 [Alcicephalus Rodler & Weithofer, 1890; Chersenotherium Alexajew, 1916 and Amotherium [sic]]
 †Samotherium boissieri Forsyth Major, 1888
 †Samotherium eminens (Alexajew, 1916) [Chersenotherium eminens Alexajew, 1916]
 †Samotherium major Bohlin, 1926
 †Samotherium neumayri (Rodler & Weithofer, 1890) [Alcicephalus neumayri Rodler & Weithofer, 1890]
 †Samotherium sinense (Schlosser, 1903) [Alcicephalus sinense Schlosser, 1903]
 Subtribe Okapiina Bohlin, 1926
 †Afrikanokeryx Harris, Solounias & Geraads, 2010
 †Afrikanokeryx leakeyi Harris, Solounias & Geraads, 2010
 Okapia Lankester, 1901
 Okapia johnstoni (P. L. Sclater, 1901) – Okapi
 †Subfamily Sivatheriinae Bonaparte, 1850
 †Birgerbohlinia Crusafont Pairó, 1952
 †Birgerbohlinia schaubi Crusafont Pairó, 1952
 †Bramatherium Falconer, 1845 [Hydaspitherium Lydekker, 1876]
 †Bramatherium giganteus Khan & Sarwar, 2002
 †Bramatherium grande (Lydekker, 1878) [Hydaspitherium grande Lydekker, 1878]
 †Bramatherium magnum (Pilgrim, 1910) [Hydaspitherium magnum Pilgrim, 1910]
 †Bramatherium megacephalum (Lydekker, 1876) [Hydaspitherium megacephalum Lydekker, 1876]
 †Bramatherium perimense Falconer, 1845
 †Bramatherium progressus Khan, Sarwar & Khan, 1993
 †Bramatherium suchovi Godina, 1977
 †Decennatherium Crusafont Pairó, 1952
 †Decennatherium rex Ríos, Sánchez & Morales, 2017
 †Decennatherium pachecoi Crusafont Pairó, 1952
 †Helladotherium Gaudry, 1860
 †Helladotherium duvernoyi (Gaudry & Lartet, 1856) [Camelopardalis duvernoyi Gaudry & Lartet, 1856]
 †Sivatherium Falconer & Cautley, 1836 [Griquatherium Haughton, 1922; Indratherium Pilgrim, 1910; Libytherium Pomel, 1892 and Orangiatherium van Hoepen, 1932]
 †Sivatherium giganteum Falconer & Cautley, 1836
 †Sivatherium hendeyi Harris, 1976
 †Sivatherium maurusium (Pomel, 1892) [Libytherium maurusium Pomel, 1892; Griquatherium cingulatum Haughton, 1922; Helladotherium olduvaiense Hopwood, 1934; Sivatherium olduvaiense (Hopwood, 1934); Libytherium olduvaiense Hopwood, 1934 and Orangiatherium vanrhyni van Hoepen, 1932]
 †Vishnutherium Lydekker, 1876
 †Vishnutherium iravadicum'' Lydekker 1876

Characteristics

The giraffe and the okapi have characteristic long necks and long legs. Ossicones are present on males and females in the giraffe, but only on males in the okapi.

Giraffids share many common features with other ruminants. They have cloven hooves and cannon bones, much like bovids, and a complex, four-chambered stomach. They have no upper incisors or upper canines, replacing them with a tough, horny pad. An especially long diastema is seen between the front and cheek teeth. The latter are selenodont, adapted for grinding up tough plant matter. Giraffids have prehensile tongues (specially adapted for grasping).

The okapi's neck is long compared to most ruminants, but not nearly so long as the giraffe's.

Distribution
The two extant genera are now confined to sub-Saharan Africa. The okapi is restricted to a small range in the northern rainforest of the Democratic Republic of Congo. Although the range of the giraffe is considerably larger, it once covered an area twice the present size — all parts of Africa that could offer an arid and dry landscape furnished with trees.

Behavior
The social structure and behavior is markedly different in okapis and giraffes, but although little is known of the okapi's behavior in the wild, a few things are known to be present in both species:
 They have an ambling gait similar to camels, with their weight supported alternately by their left and right legs, while their necks maintain balance. Giraffes can run  up to  this way and are documented to have covered  in the Sahel during the dry season.
 The dominance hierarchy, which has been well-documented among giraffes, has also been seen among captive okapis. An adult giraffe head can weigh , and if necessary, male giraffes establish a hierarchy among themselves by swinging their heads at each other,  horns first, a behavior known as "necking". A subordinate okapi signals submission by placing its head and neck on the ground.
Giraffes are sociable, whereas okapis live mainly solitary lives. Giraffes temporarily form herds of up to 20 individuals; these herds can be mixed or uniform groups of males and females, young and adults. Okapis are normally seen in mother-offspring pairs, although they occasionally gather around a prime food source.
 Giraffes and okapis are normally silent, but both have a range of vocalizations, including coughing, snorting, moaning, hissing, and whistling. Giraffes have been suggested to be able to communicate using infrasonic sounds like elephants and blue whales.

Notes

References

Mammal families
Extant Burdigalian first appearances
Taxa named by John Edward Gray